TSS Lynx was a passenger vessel built for the Great Western Railway in 1889.

History

She was built by Laird Brothers in Birkenhead as one of a trio of new ships for the Great Western Railway as a twin-screw steamer for the Channel Island Services. The other ships were TSS Gazelle and TSS Antelope.

Most of the passenger accommodation was removed in 1910, after which she was operated as a cargo vessel.

She served as minesweeper HMS Lynn in the Mediterranean during World War I and was finally broken up after 36 year’s service.

References

1889 ships
Passenger ships of the United Kingdom
Steamships of the United Kingdom
Ships built on the River Mersey
Ships of the Great Western Railway